Polyester Zeal is the major label debut studio album by the American rock band Red Sun Rising. It was released on August 7, 2015 by Razor & Tie. The album peaked outside the top 40 on the US Billboard Rock Albums chart and spawned five singles (three official and two promotional): "The Otherside", "Emotionless", "Amnesia", "Push" and "Unnatural".

Promotion
On January 10, 2017, the band was announced alongside Badflower as opening acts for Pop Evil's Rock 'N Roll Now Tour: Right Now, beginning in Louisville's Mercury Ballroom and finishing at the Dreammakers Theater in Sault Ste. Marie.

Track listing

Personnel
Adapted credits from the liner notes of Polyester Zeal.

Red Sun Rising
Mike Protich - lead vocals, guitar
Tyler Valendza - rhythm guitar
Ryan Williams - lead guitar
Ricky Miller - bass, backing vocals
Pat Gerasia - drums

Additional musician
Chris Marlette - drums

Production
George Cappellini Jr. - executive producer
Mike Gitter - A&R
Douglas M. Granger - album art
Paul Loous - mastering
Bob Marlette - producer, engineer, mixing

Charts

References 

2015 albums
Red Sun Rising albums
Razor & Tie albums
Albums produced by Bob Marlette